The Porto Corsini Mare Est gas field is a natural gas field located on the continental shelf of the Adriatic Sea. It was discovered in 1971 and developed by Eni. It began production in 1975 and produces natural gas and condensates. The total proven reserves of the Porto Corsini Mare Est gas field are around 1750 billion cubic feet (50×109m³), and production is slated to be around 161 million cubic feet/day (5×105m³) in 2010.

References

Natural gas fields in Italy